Shavez Khan is an Indian television actor. He has done his roles in various Indian television shows like Shaitaan, Encounter, Ek Hasina Thi, Savdhaan India, SuperCops vs Supervillains, Pyaar Ka The End, Pyaar Kii Ye Ek Kahaani, MTV Fanaah, Crime Patrol. He has played his recent role in Sony TV's CID.

Television
Colors's Shaitaan
Sony TV's Encounter, Crime Patrol & CID
Star Plus's Ek Hasina Thi
Life OK's Savdhaan India & SuperCops vs Supervillains
Bindass' Pyaar Ka The End
Star One's Pyaar Kii Ye Ek Kahaani
MTV's MTV Fanaah

References

Living people
Indian male television actors
Male actors in Hindi television
Male actors from Mumbai
1994 births